Kiran Khongsai is an Indian former International football player from the state of Manipur who played as a forward. Khongsai has represented India in several matches including the Nehru Cup in 1993.

References

Indian footballers
Footballers from Manipur
India international footballers
Living people
Association football forwards
Year of birth missing (living people)